Muzaffarpur Shumali , is a village of Mianwali District in the Punjab province of Pakistan. The village serves as a Union Council (an administrative subdivision) of Mianwali Tehsil. The Union Council Muzafarpur Shumali is named in the honour of Khan Bahadar Malik Muzafar Khan Bhachar Bandial Ex MLA. The village's inhabitants are mostly Zameendar, consisting of the Bhachar clan.

References

Union councils of Mianwali District
Populated places in Mianwali District